Main Street Commercial Historic District or Main Street Commercial District or Main Street Historic Commercial District may refer to:

Main Street Commercial District (Dothan, Alabama), a historic district listed on the National Register of Historic Places (NRHP) in Houston County, Alabama
Main Street Commercial District (Little Rock, Arkansas), a historic district listed on the NRHP in Pulaski County, Arkansas
Main Street Historic Commercial District (Point Arena, California), NRHP-listed in Mendocino County
Main Street Commercial District (Georgetown, Kentucky), a historic district listed on the NRHP in Scott County, Kentucky
Main Street Historic Commercial District (Georgetown, Kentucky), a boundary increase to that 
 Main Street Commercial Historic District (Kalispell, Montana), listed on the NRHP in Flathead County, Montana
 Main Street Commercial Historic District (Hamlet, North Carolina), listed on the NRHP in Richmond County, North Carolina
 Main Street Commercial Historic District (Jefferson, Wisconsin), listed on the NRHP in Jefferson County, Wisconsin
 Main Street Commercial Historic District (Platteville, Wisconsin), listed on the NRHP in Grant County, Wisconsin
 Main Street Commercial Historic District (Reedsburg, Wisconsin), listed on the NRHP in Sauk County, Wisconsin
 Stoughton Main Street Commercial Historic District, Stoughton, Wisconsin, listed on the NRHP in Dane County, Wisconsin
 Main Street Commercial Historic District (Watertown, Wisconsin), listed on the NRHP in Jefferson County, Wisconsin

See also
Main Street Historic District (disambiguation)